Karl Einar Haslestad (born 24 January 1952) is a Norwegian politician for the Labour Party.

He served as a deputy representative to the Norwegian Parliament from Vestfold during the terms 1981–1985, 1997–2001 and 2001–2005.

On the local level Haslestad is the mayor of Sande municipality since 1991.

References

1952 births
Living people
Deputy members of the Storting
Labour Party (Norway) politicians
Mayors of places in Vestfold
Place of birth missing (living people)
20th-century Norwegian politicians